Air Vice Marshal Sir Arthur Vyell Vyvyan,  (12 March 1875 – 30 September 1935) was an officer in the Royal Navy in the early 20th century, and later a senior officer in the newly created Royal Air Force.

Military career
Vyvyan joined the Royal Navy in 1891, where he was promoted to lieutenant on 14 January 1896.

In 1916, while holding the rank of captain, Vyvyan became involved in naval aviation, serving as the Assistant to the Superintendent of Aircraft Construction before being appointed the Assistant to the Director of the Air Service.

With the impending establishment of the Royal Air Force (RAF), Vyvyan was employed at the Air Ministry and was promoted to brigadier general in the RAF. Departing London just after the 1 April 1918 when the RAF was formally created, Vyvyan briefly returned to operational service as the senior RAF officer in the Mediterranean. In late April he was recalled to Great Britain and appointed the General Officer Commanding the RAF's Northern Area. The following year he became Air Officer Commanding Coastal Area, receiving a promotion to air vice marshal shortly after taking up post. He retired from the RAF in 1925.

A memorial to him lies within St James's Church, Piccadilly.

Honours and awards
 Knight Commander of the Order of the Bath – 2 Jun 1923 (CB – 3 Jun 1918)
 Distinguished Service Order – 14 Mar 1916
 Order of Saint Anna – Dec 1909 (Russia)
 Mentioned in Despatches – 14 Mar 1916, 3 Jun 1918
 Officer of the Legion of Honour – 11 Aug 1917 (France)
 Order of the Rising Sun, 3rd class – 8 Nov 1918 (Japan)
 Distinguished Service Medal (United States) – 16 Dec 1919
 Grand Commander of the Order of the Redeemer – 1920 (Greece)

References

External links
 Air of Authority – A History of RAF Organisation – Air Vice-Marshal Sir Vyell Vyvyan

|-

1875 births
1935 deaths
Companions of the Distinguished Service Order
Foreign recipients of the Distinguished Service Medal (United States)
Knights Commander of the Order of the Bath
Officiers of the Légion d'honneur
Recipients of the Order of the Rising Sun, 3rd class
Royal Air Force air marshals
Royal Navy officers
Military personnel of British India
Royal Navy personnel of World War I
Vyell
Recipients of the Distinguished Service Medal (US Army)
British people in colonial India